Lornshill Academy is a six-year comprehensive school situated in Alloa, Clackmannanshire, Scotland.  Approximately 1030 pupils are enrolled with the school.  Lornshill currently employs approximately 80 teachers and around 30 support staff. Lornshill is currently associated with seven primaries – Craigbank, Clackmannan, Banchory, Fishcross, Deerpark, Abercromby and Saint Serfs.

Pupils
Pupils are placed in one of four houses:  Devon, Forebraes, Grange and Ochil. Pupils are normally of the ages 11 – 18 and are split into a standard S1-S6.  These years are then again split into two subgroups: Junior (S1-S3), and Senior (S4-S6).

Notable former pupils

Former Liverpool F.C. and Sauchie Juniors F.C. player Alan Hansen was taught at Lornshill

Former Scotland Rugby Captain Grant Gilchrist.

Current Edinburgh Rugby player Sean Kennedy

Notable former staff
Ex-First Minister of Scotland Jack McConnell taught Maths at Lornshill.

References

External links
Lornshill Academy
Lornhill Academy's page on Scottish Schools Online

Secondary schools in Clackmannanshire
Educational institutions established in 1970
Alloa